Esporte Clube Próspera, commonly known as Próspera, is a Brazilian football club based in Criciúma, Santa Catarina state.

History
The club was founded on March 29, 1946. They won the Campeonato Catarinense Second Level in 2005.

Achievements
 Campeonato Catarinense
 Série B: 2020
 Série C: 2005, 2018

Stadium
Esporte Clube Próspera play their home games at Estádio Engenheiro Mário Balsini. The stadium has a maximum capacity of 5,000 people.

References

Association football clubs established in 1946
Football clubs in Santa Catarina (state)
1946 establishments in Brazil